Ministry of Social Policy was established on 2 May 2004 be the government of Marek Belka. It was separated from the Ministry of Economy, Labour and Social Policy. It was liquidated by the government of Kazimierz Marcinkiewicz, who included social policy in the newly established Ministry of Labour and Social Policy.

List of ministers 
 Krzysztof Pater (2004)
 Izabela Jaruga-Nowacka (2004–2005)

External links
 Official government website of Poland

References

 
 
Poland,2004 

2004 establishments in Poland